Darius Labanauskas (born 26 July 1976) is a Lithuanian professional darts player who plays in the Professional Darts Corporation (PDC) events. In 2015, he was the WDF world number 1.

Career

BDO

Labanauskas is a three-time Lithuania National Champion and won the Lithuania Open in 2011 and 2013. He also won the Baltic Cup Open in 2013, the Estonian Open in 2012 and 2013, and in 2014 he won the Trakai Castle Cup, the Riga Open and the Riga Masters. He was  runner-up in the WDF Europe Cup singles in 2014, losing to Irishman David Concannon in the final. 2014 also saw him reach the final of the Estonian Open, Finnish Open and Baltic Cup Open.

His performances in 2014 helped Labanauskas qualify for the 2015 BDO World Darts Championship outright via his world ranking. He was beaten by Robbie Green in the first round despite hitting a 167 checkout during the match.

Consistent qualification for the BDO World Championship paid off in 2017 as he reached the quarter-finals before losing 5–2 to eventual champion Glen Durrant.

PDC

In 2018 Labanauskas competed on the PDC Nordic & Baltic Pro Tour, finishing in the top two to qualify for the 2019 PDC World Darts Championship. Here he beat Matthew Edgar and Raymond van Barneveld before going out to Adrian Lewis in the last 32 with prize money of £25,000.

This run was followed by PDC European Q-School, where a disappointing first three days in Hildesheim were followed by a fantastic run all the way to the final on Day 4, where Labanauskas beat Vincent van der Meer 5–3 in the final to win a PDC Tour Card for the first time.

World Championship results

BDO
 2015: First round (lost to Robbie Green 1–3)
 2016: Preliminary round (lost to Seigo Asada 1–3)
 2017: Quarter-finals (lost to Glen Durrant 2–5)
 2018: First round (lost to Scott Mitchell 2–3)

PDC
 2019: Third round (lost to Adrian Lewis 0–4)
 2020: Quarter-finals (lost to Michael van Gerwen 2–5)
 2021: Second round (lost to Simon Whitlock 2–3)
 2022: First round (lost to Mike De Decker 1–3)
 2023: Second round (lost to Ross Smith 1–3)

Performance timeline

PDC European Tour

Nine-dart finishes

References

External links

1976 births
Living people
Lithuanian darts players
Professional Darts Corporation current tour card holders
Sportspeople from Kaunas
People from Garliava
PDC World Cup of Darts Lithuanian team